is a Japanese actress and former idol singer.

Mita debuted as an idol singer in 1982, the same year as Kyōko Koizumi and Akina Nakamori. Her first single, "Kakete Kita Otome" reached number 21 on the Oricon Singles Chart., and her second single "Natsu No Shizuku" reached number 28. She also appeared in film and television. She met the kabuki actor Nakamura Hashinosuke III, the son of the living national treasure Nakamura Shikan VII, on the set of Tora-san's Salad-Day Memorial and the two married in 1991. She has continued to act while raising their three sons.

Filmography

References

External links

JMDb Profile (in Japanese)

1966 births
Living people
Japanese actresses
Japanese idols
Japanese women singers